The Bishnupriya Manipuris, also known as the Bishnupriya Meiteis, or simply as the Bishnupriyas, are a group of Indo-Aryan  people that live in Assam, Tripura, Manipur and northeastern Bangladesh. They speak the Bishnupriya, which is a creole of Bengali language and Meitei language (officially known as Manipuri language) and it still retains its pre-Bengali features. The most distinctive feature of the language is it replete with Tibeto-Burman (Meitei) elements. The culture of the people is highly influenced by that of the Meiteis, with the exception of a few folk practices which are prevalent among the Meiteis.
In the 2020s, the Bishnupriya people started demanding that the people of their ethnicity living in Assam should be given the status of an “indigenous people” of Assam and treated like other indigenous communities of the state.
The Government of Assam categorised them under the Other Backward Class (OBC) Category but there is no legal recognition or official status of the Bishnupriyas in Manipur. The Tripura Government categorised their language under the "Tribal Language Cell" of the "State Council of Educational Research and Training".

Notable people 

 Guru Bipin Singh was a director, choreographer and teacher of Manipuri dance.
 Justice Surendra Kumar Sinha, former Chief Justice of Bangladesh

References and notes 

 
Ethnic groups in Northeast India
Ethnic groups in Bangladesh